was a Japanese architect. She was the first woman to win the Architectural Institute of Japan Award.

Career

Hayashi primarily designed residential housing for limited space environments, using innovative building materials, space utilization and clean design. In 1958, Hayashi co-founded the Hayashi, Yamada, Nakahara Architectural Design Coterie with Hatsue Yamada and Nobuko Nakahara. 

She was the first woman to win the Architectural Institute of Japan Award.

Personal life

She was married to architect Shoji Hayashi.

Notable awards
American Institute of Architects Honorary Fellowship
Architectural Institute of Japan Award

Notable works
Umi no gyararī (Gallery of the Sea), Tosashimizu, Kōchi, Japan

Further reading
Works by Masako Hayashi
House design in today's Japan. Tokyo: Shokokusha, 1969.
with Kiyoshi Kawasaki. Modern Architects's Collected Works 22 Masako Hayashi, Kiyoshi Kawasaki. Japan: San-Ichi Shobo, 1975.

References

1928 births
2001 deaths
Japanese architects
Japanese women architects